State Route 213 (SR 213) is a north–south state highway located in the eastern part of the U.S. state of Ohio. The highway's southern terminus is at an interchange that doubles as the northern split of the concurrency of U.S. Route 22 and State Route 7 just north of the city limits of Steubenville.

Route description
All of State Route 213 is nestled within the northeastern quadrant of Jefferson County.  There is no portion of this highway that is included as a part of the National Highway System.

History
SR 213 was designated in 1924, routed along the same alignment within Jefferson County that it maintains at this point in history.  No major changes have taken place to the highway's routing since it was established.

Major intersections

References

External links

213
Transportation in Jefferson County, Ohio